Order of the Brilliant Star may refer to:

Order of the Brilliant Star of Zanzibar
Order of Brilliant Star (Taiwan)